James Edward Maguire (23 July 1917 – 1990) was an English footballer, who spent the majority of his career with Wolverhampton Wanderers.

Career
Maguire moved into league football Wolverhampton Wanderers from non-league Willington in his native County Durham in 1936. He made his league debut on 14 November 1936 in a 1–2 loss at Stoke City, one of 14 appearances in his first season.

He became a first choice player the following season, as the club finished runners-up in the league. The following year brought Maguire close to silverware again but Wolves ultimately finished as runner-up in both the league and FA Cup.

He remained on the club's books during the break from competitive football caused by World War II, but never played an official game for them post-war. In May 1947, he signed for Swindon Town, where he remained for 15 months before ending his league career with a spell at Halifax Town.

He died in 1990.

Honours
Wolverhampton Wanderers
FA Cup finalist: 1939

References 
Teddy Maguire, Post War English & Scottish Football League A – Z Player's Transfer Database

1917 births
1990 deaths
English footballers
English Football League players
Wolverhampton Wanderers F.C. players
Swindon Town F.C. players
Halifax Town A.F.C. players
Willington A.F.C. players
Spennymoor United F.C. players
Association football wingers
FA Cup Final players